(First the music and then the words) is an opera in one act by Antonio Salieri to a libretto by Giovanni Battista Casti. The work was first performed on 7 February 1786 in Vienna, following a commission by the Emperor Joseph II. The opera (more specifically, a ) was first performed at one end of the orangery of the Schönbrunn Palace in Vienna by an Italian troupe; simultaneously, Mozart's Der Schauspieldirektor was staged at the other end.

The title of the opera is the theme of Richard Strauss's opera Capriccio which debates the relative importance of music and drama in opera.

Roles

Synopsis
Count Opizio contracts a new opera to be written to be ready in four days. The composer has already created the score, but the poet is suffering from writer's block and resorts to trying to adapt previous verses he has written to the existing music. The composer and poet are interrupted when Eleonora, the prima donna hired by the Count, enters and delivers a sample of her vocal artistry. Together with the Poet and the Maestro, she acts out a scene from Giuseppe Sarti's Giulio Sabino that devolves into a grotesque parody. Eleonora exits, and the librettist and the composer again wrestle with the problems of the libretto for the new opera in which a lengthy dispute between the two men ensues. Tonina (whose character is a parody of opera buffa) enters and demands a role in the new opera. The composer and the librettist quickly concoct a vocal number for her. A quarrel then erupts between Eleonora and Tonina over which of them should sing the opera's opening aria. The scene culminates in having both sing their arias simultaneously. The composer and the librettist are able to pacify the two ladies by agreeing to a juxtaposition of the seria and buffa styles, thereby putting a conciliatory end to their quarrel.

Recordings

References

Sources
 John A. Rice: "Prima la musica e poi le parole", Grove Music Online ed L. Macy (accessed 28 May 2007), grovemusic.com 
 Libretto, librettidopera.it
 Autograph score, at the Austrian National Library

Italian-language operas
Operas by Antonio Salieri
1786 operas
Operas
One-act operas